The Seedling Stars is a 1957 collection of science fiction short stories by American writer James Blish.  It was first published by Gnome Press in 1957 in an edition of 5,000 copies.  The stories concern the adaptation of humans to alien environments (a process Blish called pantropy).

Contents
 "Seeding Program" (F&SF 1956)
 "The Thing in the Attic"  (If 1954)
 "Surface Tension" (Galaxy 1952)
 "Watershed" (If 1955)

"Seeding Program" was originally published under the title "A Time to Survive". "Surface Tension" was revised from its magazine publication, and here incorporates material from Blish's earlier story "Sunken Universe", published in Super Science Stories in 1942. The four stories are termed 'Book One', 'Book Two', etc. and some editions refer to this as a standard novel in four sections, rather than an actual short story collection.

Reception
Galaxy reviewer Floyd C. Gale praised the collection as "a thought-provoking job". Anthony Boucher also received the book favorably, saying it "nicely illustrat[ed] the characteristic Blish balance between thinking and storytelling, with each reinforcing the other".

References

Sources

External links
 
 

1957 short story collections
Science fiction short story collections
Short stories by James Blish
Gnome Press books